Robert Edward Baltazar (born January 16, 1963) is a former Mexican American professional boxer in the Welterweight division.

Early life
Robert is the brother of former boxers Frankie Baltazar and Tony Baltazar.

The Baltazar brothers, Frankie, Tony and Bobby were trained and managed by father, Frank Baltazar Sr.

Professional career
On February 8, 1985 Baltazar beat the veteran Larry Yazzie to win his professional debut.

See also
Notable boxing families

References

External links

American boxers of Mexican descent
Boxers from Los Angeles
Welterweight boxers
1963 births
Living people
American male boxers